Pasiphila malachita is a moth in the family Geometridae. It is endemic to New Zealand.

The larvae feed on Hebe species.

References

Moths described in 1913
malachita
Moths of New Zealand
Endemic fauna of New Zealand
Taxa named by Edward Meyrick
Endemic moths of New Zealand